Poncha may refer to:

Poncha, an alcoholic drink from the island of Madeira
Poncha Pass, a mountain pass in south-central Colorado 
Poncha Springs, Colorado, a town in Chaffee County

People
Poncha (cacique), a native leader encountered by Vasco Núñez de Balboa in Panama
Cyrus Poncha (b. 1976), an Indian squash coach
Rehan Poncha (b. 1986), an Indian swimmer

See also
Ponca (disambiguation)